Valley Christian High School is a private Christian high school located in Chandler, Arizona, United States.

History
Valley Christian was founded in 1982 at Bethany Community Church in Tempe, Arizona to serve the East Valley, which at the time, had a lack of non-denominational Christian schools. Since its founding, it has grown and moved twice, first to another location in Tempe, then to its current site in Chandler in 1996.

In 2017, Valley Christian announced the formation of Valley Christian Junior High for the 2018-2019 school year. It is currently located at Gethsemane Church In Tempe. In 2018, after the purchase of land adjacent to the High School campus, Valley Christian announced the formation of Valley Christian Elementary School which opened for the 2019-2020 school year. The institution now serves grades K–12

Academics

On average, more than 97% of the school's graduates go on to attend college. In 2006 a special education program was implemented, known as VINE, which now has approximately 35 students. Valley Christian is one of the only Christian high schools in Arizona to have a full-time special education program.

Valley Christian offers Advanced Placement and college dual enrollment courses to students.  These programs give upperclassmen the opportunity to acquire college credits while attending the high school.  The school is also accredited by the NCA and Association of Christian Schools International (ACSI).

Athletics

Valley Christian High School is a member of the Arizona Interscholastic Association 3A Conference. Since becoming a full member of the AIA in 1987, the Trojans have won 61 Arizona State Championships, finished state runner-up 28 times and won 124 region and section championships.

The girls' track and field program won a national record fifteen straight titles under head coach Dan Kuiper. Kuiper has been named the National Track & Field Coach of the Year twice (2005; 2012) and is a member of the NHSCA High School Coaches Hall of Fame. Kuiper ranks third in the history of the State of Arizona for state championships won, with 27, and has been named Arizona Coach of the Year 16 times.

The school has also won championships in women's basketball, volleyball, swimming & diving, cheer and cross country; and men's championships in basketball, cross country, football, swimming & diving, soccer, baseball, and golf.

Basketball coaches Greg Haagsma (boys) and Scott Timmer (girls) have combined for six state titles and nearly 900 career wins, all at Valley Christian High School. In 2015, Timmer retired as the women’s basketball coach and was replaced by Kevin Allen. The Boys basketball team most recently won a 3a State championship in 2019.

VCHS hired Jeff Rutledge in the spring of 2013 to lead the Trojan football team.  Rutlege played quarterback for the 1978 University of Alabama football national championship team and is a member of the Crimson Tide Hall of Fame. Rutledge and the school parted ways in 2018. They hired Kirk Sunberg that spring.

Valley Christian was awarded the inaugural Blue Cross and Blue Shield Directors Cup Award in 2004, given to the Arizona high school that is rated highest in participation, sportsmanship and success in all athletic programs. It has also received the Donald F. Stone Award six times. This award is given to one 2A or 3A school which shows the highest overall excellence in interscholastic competition.

In 1996, the Valley Christian athletic program was named the #1 Women's High School Athletic Program in the nation by Athletic Management. It is also a recipient of the Tony Komadina Award for Outstanding Girls' Athletic Program in Arizona. The 1999 volleyball team was ranked as high as #3 in the nation before finishing the season ranked #5. That team saw five girls play Division I volleyball, including four who signed for Arizona State University.

The school has had two student-athletes, two coaches and a team inducted into the Chandler Sports Hall of Fame. Track & field coach Dan Kuiper, volleyball coach Deanna Anglin, the 1999 volleyball team, Courtney Blocher Landers and Kim Wigoldy Jasperse each have earned induction into this elite group.

The Trojans had 31 graduates play collegiate athletics in 2012-13, including nine at the NCAA Division I level. Of the nine, four were Pac-12 athletes.

Notable alumni

 David Melhorn ‘04, Arizona State track and field runner, Championship head coach of the Valley Christian’s Boys and Girls track and field team.
 Alaina Bergsma '08, University of Oregon, NCAA and Pac-12 Volleyball Player of the Year, Team USA Volleyball, Miss Oregon USA
 Kelsey Moore '08, UTEP volleyball, Miss Texas

References

Christian schools in Arizona
Nondenominational Christian schools in the United States
Private high schools in Arizona
Schools in Maricopa County, Arizona